A Good Man may refer to:

 "A Good Man" (song), a 2006 song by Emerson Drive.
 A Good Man (1941 film), an Argentinean film.
 A Good Man (2011 film), a documentary film.
 A Good Man (2014 film), an action crime film.
 A Good Man (2020 film), a French-Belgian film.

See also
 Goodman (disambiguation)